Ghatshila is a census town in the Ghatshila CD block in the Ghatshila subdivision of the East Singhbhum district, in the Indian state of Jharkhand.

History 
Legend says that the royal family of the Kingdom of Dhalbhum had originated from the northwest (Dhara and Mandu), located at the border of Rajasthan. Legend goes on to say that around 1300 AD, Dhalbhum was wrested from him by Raja Jagat Deo from Jagner near Dholpur and belonged to Dhar in Malwa Rajputana, who later assumed the name of Raja Jagannath Deo Dhabal Deb I. Originally Raja Jaganath Deo Dhabal Deb I belonged to the Parmar Rajput clan from Dhar in Malwa. They established themselves by conquest in western part of Bengal, the area commonly known as Jungle Mahals. These families kept up a sort of semi-royal state and dignified their heir-apparent and those in immediate succession with title of honor, which denotes precedence. Thus, in the Dhalbhum family, the oldest son of the ruling king (Rajah) took the title of Jubraj, the second that of Hikkim, the third of Barathakur, the fourth that of Kuar, the fifth that of Musib and the rest Babu.

Raja Jaganath constructed the Rankini Mandir at Galudih. But due to some problem, he shifted the Kali temple along with all the associates and other people to Ghatsila and built up a temple of goddess Kali, beside Ghatshila police station which is known as Rankini Mata.

Ghatshila was the administrative capital of Dhalbhum & Jamboni Zamindari. Ghatshila has several palaces, schools and administrative buildings constructed by the rulers of Dhalbhum zamindari.

Raja Jagadish Chandra Deo Dhabal Deb of Dhalbhum & Jamboni Zamindari was the last recognised ruler of Dhalbhum & Jamboni Zamindari.

Rebellions 
In 1766, Raja Jagannath Singh, a zamindar of Dampara of Ghatsila in Dhalbhum, revolted against the enhanced revenue taxes of the British East India Company. This revolt is well known as Chuar revolt, the first revolt against British East India Company in Bengal Presidency.

The British removed Raja Jagannath Deo Dhabal Deb VI, the ruler of Dhalbhum, from his throne and made Baikunth Dhal (Nemu Dhal) the king. Unhappy with the decision, Raja Jagannath Dhal revolted, called Dhal revolt. In which the Rajah of Jhargram and Raja Jagannath Singh, the zamindar of Ghatsila, assisted him. The English Company sent Lieutenant Rook and Charles Magan to suppress the rebellion. In 1777, the British re-proclaimed Jagannath Dhal as the king, after which the rebellion was quelled.

Geography

Location

It is 45 km from Jamshedpur. The town is located on the bank of the Subarnarekha River, and it is situated in a forested area. It contains a railway station on the main line of the South Eastern Railway. Ghatsila was formerly the headquarters of the kingdom of Dhalbhum.

Ghatsila has its diversity with dams, falls, rivers, forest, mountains and valley. The scenes are breathtaking especially at sunset. It has a township as well as a village touch. There are areas where people still do farming for a living; these areas are untouched and unexplored.

There is a community development block named Ghatshila block, which has its headquarters at Ghatshila. This block was established on 4 May 1962.

Area overview
The area shown in the map “forms a part of the Chota Nagpur Plateau and is a hilly upland tract”.  The main rivers draining the district are the Subarnarekha and the Kharkai. The area lying between Jamshedpur and Ghatshila is the main industrial mining zone. The rest of the district is primarily agricultural. In the district, as of 2011,  56.9% of the population lives in the rural areas and a high 43.1% lives in the urban areas.

Note: The map alongside presents some of the notable locations in the district. All places marked in the map are linked in the larger full screen map.

Civic administration
There is a police station at Ghatshila.

Demographics 
According to the 2011 Census of India, Ghatshila had a total population of 40,624, of which 20,912 (51%) were males and 17,912 (49%) were females. Population in the age range 0–6 years was 4,292. The total number of literate persons in Ghatshila was 30,892 (85.03% of the population over 6 years).

(*For language details see Ghatshila block#Language and religion)

 India census, Ghatshila had a population of 37,850.  Males constitute 53% of the population and females 47%. Ghatshila has an average literacy rate of 73%, higher than the national average of 59.5%: male literacy is 79%, and female literacy is 65%. In Ghatshila, 11% of the population is under 6 years of age.

Religion

Hinduism is the dominant religion in Ghatshila, followed by 76.66% of the population. Islam is a significant minority, followed by 11.56% of the population. Other religions with a significant number of adherents include Sikhism (2.28%) and Christianity (1.62%).

Languages

According to 2011 census, Bengali was the most spoken language in Ghatshila town with 20,572 speakers followed by Hindi at 9,215, Urdu at 3,085, Santali at 2,602 and Odia at 2,130.

Infrastructure
Among the civic amenities, it had  of roads with both closed and open drains, the protected water supply involved hand pump, tap water from treated sources, overhead tank. It had 8,153 domestic electric connections, 116 road lighting points. Among the medical facilities, it had 1 hospital (with 70 beds), 20 dispensaries, 20 health centres, 1 family welfare centre, 1 maternity and child welfare centre, 2 nursing homes, 1 veterinary hospital, 25 medicine shops. It had 1 non-formal education centre (Sarva Shiksha Abhiyan), Among social, cultural and recreational facilities, it had 1 stadium, 1 cinema theatre, 1 auditorium/ community hall, 2 public libraries, 2 reading rooms. An important commodity it produced was copper. It had the branch offices of 3 nationalised banks, 1 private commercial bank, 1 cooperative bank, 1 agricultural credit society.

Economy 

Hindustan Copper Limited is located at Moubhandar, a mile away. This is the chief employer or indirect source of income for the people of Ghatshila, Moubhandar, Musabani and nearby villages. Ghatshila is best known for these mines because they are Asia's first copper mines and the world's second deepest mines.

Transport 

Ghatshila is connected to most of the important stations in Bihar and Jharkhand through rail and road network. Jamshedpur is at a distance of 45 km (by road) and 37 km (by railroad) west of this town. Most of the trains running from Kharagpur that goes to west towards Jamshedpur, have a stoppage here. Distance between Ghatsila and Kharagpur is about 98 km.

By rail
It is a railway station on the Kharagpur-Tatanagar section of Howrah–Mumbai track, 215 km from Howrah. Notable trains which stop here are Ispat Express (train no. 12781/12782), Kurla–Howrah Express (train no. 18030/18029), Steel Express (train no. 12813/12814). It is well connected to 3 metros in India namely Mumbai (by Bombay Express), Kolkata (many trains starting from 6 o'clock in the morning by Steel Express to midnight at 1.15 by Samleshwari Exp) and New Delhi (by Neelachal Express, Purushottam Express and Utkal Express). There are many local Passenger trains connecting Jamshedpur and Kharagpur with Ghatshila.

By road
It is about 240 km from Kolkata. Those traveling from Kolkata first have to take NH 6 to Baharagora and then take the road to Jamshedpur. Buses plying between Kharagpur and Jamshedpur pass through Ghatshila. Buses plying from Bhubaneswar or Kolkata to Jamshedpur or Ranchi also pass through Ghatshila. By road Jamshedpur is 45 km away. There are many buses connecting Ghatsila to Jamshedpur daily, from morning 6 o'clock to evening 5 o'clock. There are two routes connecting Jamshedpur to Ghatsila, one route through NH33 and another route through Jadugoda.

Media 
Radio Station: 100.1 MHz (Akashvani Ghatshila)

Sports 
To enhance the mental and physical wellness sports play a crucial role. There are ample number of sports clubs and grounds distributed over the town. Some of them are enlisted below:
 Moubhandar Sports Club - Hindustan Copper Limited Ground at Moubhandar
 Golf Ground at Moubhandar
 Rajstate Ground at Rajstate
 Dakbunglow Ground at Dakbunglow Road
 Gandhi Maidan at Harijan basti
 Football Ground in Moubhandar
 Basuki Singh Cricket Ground
Moubhandar Sports Club organises a cricket tournament every December. The tournament is named after the memory of Late. Basuki Singh. Basuki Singh Memorial cricket tournament is quite famous in Ghatsila.
 Bardih Ground in Kashida
 Circus Maidan Ground

Festivals
Ghatsila has a very diverse culture and a number of community live here peacefully. Many festivals are celebrated here. Some of the main festivals are:
 Sagun Sohrai
 Durga puja
 Ganesh Puja
 Baha Bonga
 Makar Porob
 Chatt
 Dipawali (Diwali)
 Sohrai
 Mage Porob
 Saraswati Puja
 Laxmi Puja
 Ganesh Puja

There are many other festivals also.

Tourism 
Some of the places of interest are:
 Subarnarekha River, Moubhandar, Ghatshila - riverfront 
 Chota Pul at Swarnarekha River
 Fuldungri Pahar at Phuldungri, Ghatshila 
 Famous Bengali Writer Bibhuti Bhushan Bandhopadhayay's Cottage at Dahigora, Ghatshila and Library at college road, Ghatshila 
 Ramkrishna Math, Dahigora, Ghatshila 
 Brahmarshi Jagadananda sanyas ashram, Dahigora, Ghatshila
 Ghatsila Rajbari, Rajstate
 Shivdas Ghosh Children's Park, Tamukpal
 Rankini Mandir, Ghatshila
 Ghatsila City Centre, College road, Ghatsila

Near North
 Burudi Dam
 Dharagiri Fall

Near East
 Amadubi-Panijiya Rural Tourism Centre, Panijiya, Jharkhand 832302				

Near West
 Rankini Mandir, Jadugoda, Rohinibera
 Galudih Barrage, Ulda, Jharkhand 832304
 Birsa Fun City Waterpark, Karanja, Jharkhand 832304

Education 
There are large number of schools and colleges which help a large number of youths to get their primary education in the town itself which has also helped in increasing the literacy rate of Ghatshila to 73%. Some of the prominent schools and colleges are listed below.

Schools

 Kendriya Vidyalaya Surda,Ghatshila
 Irvine Adventist School ,Gopalpur 
 Sant Nandalal Smriti Vidya Mandir 
 St. Joseph's Convent School at Tumandungri, Musaboni 
 St. Joseph's Convent School (Kashida)
 Gyandeep Public School
 J.C School at College Road
 Saraswati Shishu Vidyamandir 
 Sri Sri Vidyamandir at Kasidah
 Marwadi Hindi High School 
 St. Paul High School
 The Oxford Convent at Dahigora
 Loreto Convent Public School
 Holy Heart School

Colleges
 Ghatsila College 
 Ghatsila Women's College at Kasidah

References

Ghatsila Tourist Information Center

External links

Cities and towns in East Singhbhum district